Luis Antonio García Morales (August 6, 1929 – July 3, 2015) was a Venezuelan poet and a cultural promoter born in Ciudad Bolívar. In 1984, his book of poems El río siempre won the prize of the Venezuela's National Council of Culture.

García was a member of the Sardio group in 1958, along with writers Guillermo Sucre, Salvador Garmendia, Rodolfo Izaguirre and Elisa Lerner. By the end of the 1950s, he traveled to Paris, where he settled down for three years, during that time he went across a part of Europe and the Middle East. In 1963 he returned to Venezuela, and was designated as editorial chief of the National Culture Magazine, he also worked in the direction of the Radio Nacional de Venezuela, the INCIBA (National Institute for Fine Arts) and the seal Monte Avila Editores. In 1975, he was the founding president of the National Council for Culture (Conac).                    
In the 1980s he hosted El Cantar de los Cantares in the Cultural Radio Station of Caracas. For thirteen years, this program was dedicated to poetry. When he died in Caracas on 3 July 2015, as a result of a respiratory collapse, his ashes were scattered into the Orinoco River (to which he dedicated a big part of his life's artistic work) located in his hometown.

Books 
Lo real y la memoria (1962)
El río siempre (1983)
De un sol a otro (1997. Caracas Prize for Poetry in 1998)

References 
  Biography and part of his work
  Luis García Morales (1929-2015) - Correo del Caroní
  El callado adiós de Luis García Morales (1929-2015) - Francisco Javier Pérez/El Nacional
Luis García Morales - Goodreads.com

1929 births
2015 deaths
20th-century Venezuelan poets
People from Ciudad Bolívar
Venezuelan male poets
20th-century male writers